Bunk Foss is a census-designated place (CDP) in Snohomish County, Washington, United States. The population was 3,570 at the 2010 census. Bunk Foss was created out of the former West Lake Stevens CDP in 2010.

Geography 
Bunk Foss is located at  (47.961686, -122.094387).

According to the United States Census Bureau, the CDP has a total area of 3.874 square miles (10.03 km), all of it land.

References 

Census-designated places in Washington (state)
Census-designated places in Snohomish County, Washington